Tai Kok Tsui South is one of the 20 constituencies in the Yau Tsim Mong District. The constituency returns one district councillor to the Yau Tsim Mong District Council, with an election every four years.

Councillors represented

Election results

2010s

References

Tai Kok Tsui
Constituencies of Hong Kong
Constituencies of Yau Tsim Mong District Council
Constituencies established in 2007
2007 establishments in Hong Kong